Poland is a country that extends across the North European Plain from the Sudetes and Carpathian Mountains in the south to the sandy beaches of the Baltic Sea in the north. Poland is the fifth-most populous country of the European Union and the ninth-largest country in Europe by area.

Topographically, Poland is a diverse country; although most of the central terrain is flat, there is an abundance of lakes, rivers, hills, swamps, beaches, islands and forests elsewhere. The Baltic coast has two natural harbours, the larger situated in the Gdańsk-Gdynia region, and the smaller near Szczecin in the far northwest. The northeastern region, also known as the Masurian Lake District with more than 2,000 lakes, is densely wooded and sparsely populated. To the south of the lake district, and across central Poland a vast region of plains stretches all the way to the Sudetes on the Czech and German borders southwest, and to the Carpathians on the Czech, Slovak and Ukrainian borders southeast. The central lowlands had been formed by glacial erosion in the Pleistocene ice age.

Topography
The country extends 649 kilometers from north to south and 689 kilometers from east to west. The average elevation is 173 meters, and only 3% of Polish territory, along the southern border, is elevated higher than 500 meters. The country's highest peak is Mount Rysy, which rises 2,499 meters in the Tatra Range of the Carpathian Mountains, 95 kilometers south of Kraków. About 63 square kilometers along the Gulf of Gdańsk are below sea level. It has an exclusive economic zone of  within the Baltic Sea.

Topographic regions
Poland is traditionally divided into five topographic zones from north to south.

The largest, the central lowlands or "Polish Plain" ( or Nizina Polska), is narrow in the west, then expands to the north and south as it extends eastward. Along the eastern border, this zone reaches from the far northeast to within 200 kilometers of the southern border. The terrain in the central lowlands is quite flat, and earlier glacial lakes have been filled by sediment. The region is cut by several major rivers, including the Oder (Odra), which defines the Silesian Lowlands in the southwest, and the Vistula, which defines the lowland areas of east-central Poland.

To the south of the lowlands are the lesser Poland uplands, a belt varying in width from 90 to 200 kilometers, formed by the gently sloping foothills of the Sudeten and Carpathian mountain ranges and the uplands that connect the ranges in south-central Poland. The topography of this region is divided transversely into higher and lower elevations, reflecting its underlying geological structure. In the western section, the Silesia-Kraków Upthrust contains rich coal deposits.

The third topographic area is located on either side of Poland's southern border and is formed by the Sudeten and Carpathian ranges. Within Poland, neither of these ranges is forbidding enough to prevent substantial habitation; the Carpathians are not densely populated. The rugged form of the Sudeten range derives from the geological shifts that formed the later Carpathian uplift. The highest elevation in the Sudeten is Śnieżka (1,602 meters) in the Karkonosze Mountains. The Carpathians in Poland, formed as a discrete topographical unit in the relatively recent Tertiary Era, are the highest mountains in the country. They are the northernmost edge of a much larger range that extends into the Czech Republic, Slovakia, Ukraine, Hungary, and Romania. Within Poland the range includes two major basins, the Oświęcim and Sandomierz, which are rich in several minerals and natural gas.

To the north of the central lowlands, the lake region includes primeval forests - one of the last remaining in Europe and much of Poland's shrinking unspoiled natural habitat. Glacial action in this region formed lakes and low hills in the otherwise flat terrain adjacent to Lithuania and the Baltic Sea. Small lakes dot the entire northern half of Poland, and the glacial formations that characterize the lake region extend as much as 200 kilometers inland in western Poland. Wide river valleys divide the lake region into three parts. In the northwest, Pomerania is located south of the Baltic coastal region and north of the Warta and Noteć rivers. Masuria occupies the remainder of northern Poland and features a string of larger lakes. Most of Poland's 9,300 lakes that are more than 10,000 square metres in area are located in the northern part of the lake region, where they occupy about 10% of the surface area.

The Baltic coastal plains are a low-lying region formed of sediments deposited by the sea. The coastline was shaped by the action of the rising sea after the Scandinavian ice sheet retreated. The two major inlets in the smooth coast are the Pomeranian Bay on the German border in the far northwest and the Gulf of Gdańsk in the east. The Oder River empties into the former, and the Vistula forms a large delta at the head of the latter. Sandbars with large dunes form lagoons and coastal lakes along much of the coast.

Geology

The geological structure of Poland has been shaped by the continental collision of Europe and Africa over the past 60 million years on the one hand and the other by the Quaternary glaciations of northern Europe. Both processes shaped the Sudetes and the Carpathian Mountains. The moraine landscape of northern Poland contains soils made up mostly of sand or loam, while the ice age river valleys of the south often contain loess. The Kraków-Częstochowa Upland, the Pieniny, and the Western Tatras consist of limestone, while the High Tatras, the Beskids, and the Karkonosze are made up mainly of granite and basalts. The Polish Jura Chain is one of the oldest mountain ranges on earth.

The Polish Tatras, which consist of the High Tatras and the Western Tatras, is the highest mountain group of Poland and of the entire Carpathian range. In the High Tatras lies Poland's highest point, the north-western summit of Rysy,  in elevation. At its foot lies the mountain lakes of Czarny Staw pod Rysami (Black Lake below Mount Rysy), and Morskie Oko (the Marine Eye).

The only desert located in Poland stretches over the Zagłębie Dąbrowskie (the Coal Fields of Dąbrowa) region. It is called the Błędów Desert, located in the Silesian Voivodeship in southern Poland. It is one of only five natural deserts in Europe. But also, it is the warmest desert that appears at this latitude. Błędów Desert was created thousands of years ago by a melting glacier.

The Baltic Sea activity in Słowiński National Park created sand dunes which in the course of time separated the bay from the sea. As waves and wind carry sand inland the dunes slowly move, at a speed of  meters per year. The highest peak of the park – Rowokol ( above sea level) — is also an excellent observation point.

Land use

Poland is the fourth most forested country in Europe. Forests cover about 30.5% of Poland's land area based on international standards. Its overall percentage is still increasing. Forests of Poland are managed by the National Program of Reforestation (KPZL), aiming an increase of forest-coverage to 33% in 2050. The richness of Polish forests (per SoEF 2011 statistics) is more than twice as high as the European average (with German and French forests being at the top), containing 2.304 billion cubic metres of trees. The largest forest complex in Poland is Lower Silesian Wilderness.

More than 1% of Poland's territory, is protected within 23 Polish national parks. Three more national parks are projected for Masuria, the Kraków-Częstochowa Upland, and the eastern Beskids. In addition, wetlands along lakes and rivers in central Poland are legally protected, as are coastal areas in the north. There are over 120 areas designated as landscape parks, along with numerous nature reserves and other protected areas (e.g. Natura 2000).

Present-day Poland is a country with favorable agricultural prospects, and over two million private farms. It is the leading producer of potatoes and rye in Europe, the world's largest producer of triticale, and one of the more important producers of barley, oats, sugar beets, flax, and various fruits. It is also the European Union's fourth largest supplier of pig meat after Germany, Spain and France.

Biodiversity

Phytogeographically, Poland belongs to the Central European province of the Circumboreal Region within the Boreal Kingdom. According to the World Wide Fund for Nature, the territory of Poland belongs to three Palearctic Ecoregions of the continental forest spanning Central and Northern European temperate broadleaf and mixed forest ecoregions as well as the Carpathian montane conifer forest.

Many animals that have since died out in other parts of Europe still survive in Poland, such as the wisent in the ancient woodland of the Białowieża Forest and in Podlaskie. Other such species include the brown bear in Białowieża, in the Tatras, and in the Beskids, the gray wolf and the Eurasian lynx in various forests, the moose in northern Poland, and the beaver in Masuria, Pomerania, and Podlaskie.

In the forests, one also encounters game animals, such as red deer, roe deer and wild boars. In eastern Poland there are a number of ancient woodlands, like Białowieża forest, that have never been cleared by people. There are also large forested areas in the mountains, Masuria, Pomerania, Lubusz Land and Lower Silesia.

Poland is the most important breeding ground for a variety of European migratory birds. Out of all of the migratory birds who come to Europe for the summer, one quarter of the global population of white storks (40,000 breeding pairs) live in Poland, particularly in the lake districts and the wetlands along the Biebrza, the Narew, and the Warta, which are part of nature reserves or national parks.

Hydrology

The Vistula and the Oder flow into the Baltic Sea, as do numerous smaller rivers in Pomerania.

The Łyna and the Angrapa flow by way of the Pregolya to the Baltic, and the Czarna Hańcza flows into the Baltic through the Neman. While the great majority of Poland's rivers drain into the Baltic Sea, Poland's Beskids are the source of some of the upper tributaries of the Orava, which flows via the Váh and the Danube to the Black Sea. The eastern Beskids are also the source of some streams that drain through the Dniester to the Black Sea.

Poland's rivers have been used since early times for navigation. The Vikings, for example, traveled up the Vistula and the Oder in their longships. In the Middle Ages and in early modern times, when the Polish–Lithuanian Commonwealth was the breadbasket of Europe; the shipment of grain and other agricultural products down the Vistula toward Gdańsk and onward to other parts of Europe took on great importance.

With almost ten thousand closed bodies of water covering more than  each, Poland has one of the highest numbers of lakes in the world. In Europe, only Finland has a greater density of lakes.

In addition to the lake districts in the north (in Masuria, Pomerania, Kashubia, Lubuskie, and Greater Poland), there is also a large number of mountain lakes in the Tatras, of which the Morskie Oko is the largest in area. The lake with the greatest depth—of more than —is Lake Hańcza in the Wigry Lake District, east of Masuria in Podlaskie Voivodeship.

Among the first lakes whose shores were settled are those in the Greater Polish Lake District. The stilt house settlement of Biskupin, occupied by more than one thousand residents, was founded before the 7th century BC by people of the Lusatian culture.

Lakes have always played an important role in Polish history and continue to be of great importance to today's modern Polish society. The ancestors of today's Poles, the Polanie, built their first fortresses on islands in these lakes. The legendary Prince Popiel ruled from Kruszwica tower erected on the Lake Gopło. The first historically documented ruler of Poland, Duke Mieszko I, had his palace on an island in the Warta River in Poznań. Nowadays the Polish lakes provide a location for the pursuit of water sports such as yachting and wind-surfing.

For the most part, Poland has a smooth coastline, which has been shaped by the continual movement of sand by currents and winds. This continual erosion and deposition has formed cliffs, dunes, and spits, many of which have migrated landwards to close off former lagoons, such as Łebsko Lake in Słowiński National Park.

Prior to the end of the Second World War and subsequent change in national borders, Poland had only a very small coastline; this was situated at the end of the 'Polish Corridor', the only internationally recognised Polish territory which afforded the country access to the sea. However, after World War II, the redrawing of Poland's borders and resulting 'shift' of the country's borders left it with a greatly expanded coastline, thus allowing for far greater access to the sea than was ever previously possible. The significance of this event, and importance of it to Poland's future as a major industrialised nation, was alluded to by the 1945 Wedding to the Sea.

The largest spits are Hel Peninsula and the Vistula Spit. The largest Polish Baltic island is Wolin. The largest sea harbours are Szczecin, Świnoujście, Gdańsk, Gdynia, Police and Kołobrzeg. The main coastal resorts are Świnoujście, Międzyzdroje (Misdroy), Kołobrzeg, Łeba, Sopot, Władysławowo and the Hel Peninsula.

Drainage

Nearly all of Poland is swirled northward into the Baltic Sea by the Vistula, the Oder, and the tributaries of these two major rivers. About half the country is drained by the Vistula, which originates in the Silesian Beskids in far south-central Poland.

The Vistula Basin includes most of the eastern half of the country and is drained by a system of rivers that mainly join the Vistula from the east. One of the tributaries, the Bug, defines 280 kilometers of Poland's eastern border with Ukraine and Belarus.

The Oder and its major tributary, the Warta, and a few smaller rivers as Kłodnica, Mała Panew, Bóbr, Lusatian Neisse (Nysa Łużycka) and Ina, form a basin that drains the western third of Poland into the Bay of Szczecin. The drainage effect on a large part of Polish terrain is weak, however, especially in the lake region and the inland areas to its south. The predominance of swampland, level terrain, and small, shallow lakes hinders large-scale movement of water. The rivers have two high-water periods per year. The first is caused by melting snow and ice dams in spring adding to the volume of lowland rivers; the second is caused by heavy rains in July.

Climate

Poland's long-term and short-term weather patterns are made transitional and variable by the collision of diverse air masses above the country's surface. Maritime air moves across Western Europe, Arctic air sweeps down from the North Atlantic Ocean, and subtropical air arrives from the South Atlantic Ocean. Although the Polar air dominates for much of the year, its conjunction with warmer currents generally moderates temperatures and generates considerable precipitation, clouds, and fog.

The spring arrives slowly in March or April, bringing mainly sunny days after a period of alternating wintertime and springtime conditions. Summer, which extends from June to August, is generally less humid than winter. Showers and thunderstorms alternate with dry sunny weather that is generated when southern and eastern winds prevail. Early autumn is generally sunny and warm before a period of rainy, colder weather in November begins the transition into winter. Winter, which may last from one to three months, brings frequent snowstorms but relatively low total precipitation.

On the highest mountain peaks, the mean temperature is below . The Baltic coast, influenced by moderating west winds, mostly in Świnoujście, Międzyzdroje, Dziwnów, Nowe Warpno, Police and Szczecin, has cooler summers and warmer winters. The other temperature extreme is in the southeast along the border with Ukraine, where the greatest seasonal differences occur and winter temperatures average 4.5 °C below those in western Poland. The hottest cities in Poland are Tarnów, Wrocław and Słubice.

The average temperatures are rising, however. In the period of 1980 to 2010, there were 19 Decembers without snow, and in the period of 2000 to 2010 seven. December 2006 was the warmest one in Poland since 1779. In most of Poland, average temperatures rose by 3-5 degrees Celsius during the last three decades.

The total is slightly higher in the southern uplands than in the central plains. In winter about half the precipitation in the lowlands and the entire amount in the mountains falls as snow. On average, precipitation in summer is twice of that in winter, providing a dependable supply of water for crops. The growing season is about 40 days longer in the southwest than in the northeast, where spring arrives latest. 

The highest temperature recorded in Poland occurred on 29 July 1921 at Prószków. The lowest temperature ever recorded in Poland occurred on 11 January 1940 in Siedlce.
The highest winter temperature in Poland was recorded occurred on 25 February 2021 and lowest in summer was recorded on 21 July 1996. The highest temperature in January, 18.9 °C, was reported in Warsaw on January 1, 2022, at 11:30 AM. The New Year's Eve night was also among the warmest winter nights in history of the region, with temperatures reaching 17 °C in Słubice around midnight.

Political geography

Poland's current voivodeships (provinces) are largely based on the country's historic regions, whereas those of the past two decades (to 1998) had been centred on and named for individual cities. Administrative authority at voivodeship level is shared between a government-appointed voivode (governor), an elected regional assembly (sejmik) and an executive elected by that assembly.

The voivodeships are subdivided into powiats (often referred to in English as counties), and these are further divided into gminas (also known as communes or municipalities). Major cities normally have the status of both gmina and powiat. Poland has 16 voivodeships, 379 powiats (including 65 cities with powiat status), and 2,478 gminas.

Historical regions of the current Polish state

Within Poland's modern borders are the following historic regions (in alphabetical order):
Greater Poland
Kuyavia 
Lesser Poland with parts of Red Ruthenia
Lithuania Minor, only partially in Poland
Lubusz Land
Lusatia, smaller section in Poland, larger in Germany
Masovia
Masuria
New March, partially in Poland, historically Brandenburg
Podlaskie
Pomerania
Pomerelia
Prussia, only partially in modern Poland, also a German historical region
Silesia, also extends to parts of the Czech Republic and Germany.
Warmia

Statistics 
Area - comparative: slightly larger than Oman.
Land boundaries: total: .
Border countries and length: Belarus: , Czech Republic: , Germany: , Lithuania: , Russia (via Kaliningrad Oblast): , Slovakia: , and Ukraine: 
Coastline: .
Territorial sea: 
Elevation extremes: lowest point Raczki Elbląskie ; highest point: Rysy 
Sea islands: Wolin, eastern part of Uznam (Usedom)

Resources and land use
Natural resources: coal, sulfur, copper, natural gas, iron, zinc, lead, salt, arable land
Land use: arable land: 47%; permanent crops: 15%; permanent pastures 13%
Forests of Poland and woodlands: 29%; other: 10% (1993 est.)
Irrigated land: 1,000 km.2 (1993 est.)
Important rivers: Vistula (()), Oder (()), Bug, Warta River, Narew, San

Environmental concerns

Natural hazards: Occasional flooding

National parks

Environment - current issues:
The situation has improved since 1989 due to decline in heavy industry and
increased environmental concern by postcommunist governments; air pollution
nonetheless remains serious because of sulfur dioxide emissions from
coal-fired power plants, and the resulting acid rain has caused forest damage; water pollution from industrial and municipal sources is also a problem, as is disposal of hazardous wastes. Disposal of the country's coal ash is aided by revegetation. Żołnierz et al., 2016 find the return of bush species is naturally phytoremediating fly ash dumps.

Environment - international agreements:

party to:
Air Pollution, Antarctic-Environmental Protocol, Antarctic Treaty, Biodiversity, Climate Change, Endangered Species, Environmental Modification, Hazardous Wastes, Law of the Sea, Marine Dumping, Nuclear Test Ban, Ozone Layer Protection, Ship Pollution, Wetlands

signed, but not ratified:
Air Pollution-Nitrogen Oxides, Air Pollution-Persistent Organic Pollutants, Air Pollution-Sulphur 1994, Climate Change-Kyoto Protocol

Geography - note:
historically, an area of conflict because of flat terrain and the lack of natural barriers on the North European Plain

See also

Administrative division of Poland
Borders of Poland
Extreme points of Poland
Tourism in Poland
List of caves in Poland
List of cities in Poland
List of forests in Poland
List of islands of Poland
List of rivers of Poland
List of mountains in Poland
Poland A and B

References

External links
 Online Map of Poland

European Plain
Geography of Europe